Margaret Sanborn (1915–2005) was an American writer and biographer of Robert E. Lee and Mark Twain.

History
Margaret Sanborn resided in Mill Valley, California, north of San Francisco near the Pacific Ocean. She died early in 2005 leaving a son, David R. Sanborn, and a daughter, Catherine.

Margaret Sanborn came to prominence in 1966 with the publication of Robert E. Lee: A Portrait [1807-1861], the first volume of her two-volume biography of the Confederate general which won critical acclaim.

In an interview given in 1997 at the Library of Congress, Sanborn relates the story of how she came to be the writer of the final volume in the Rivers of America Series, The American, River of El Dorado. In 2004 Sanborn received a Milley Award for contributions to the arts from the Mill Valley Art Commission.

Partial bibliography
Non-Fiction

Robert E. Lee. A Portrait. [1807-1861] (Lippincott, Philadelphia, 1966)

Robert E. Lee: the Complete Man 1861-1870 (Lippincott, Philadelphia, 1967)

The American: River of El Dorado (Holt, Rinehart and Winston, New York, 1974)

The Grand Tetons (G. P. Putnam's Sons, New York, 1978)

Yosemite – Its Discovery, Its Wonders & Its People (Random House, New York, 1981)

Mark Twain: The Bachelor Years: A Biography (Doubleday, New York, 1990)

References
General Catalog of Old Books and Authors
An American Rivers Saga
Milley Awards

1915 births
2005 deaths
American travel writers
American women travel writers
20th-century American biographers
American women biographers
20th-century American women
21st-century American women